Victor Walters was an English footballer who played in the Football League for Leicester Fosse.

References

Year of birth unknown
Date of death unknown
English footballers
Leicester City F.C. players
English Football League players
Association football forwards